The Linden Heights Historic District is located on the west side Des Moines, Iowa, United States. The district exemplifies the residential styles that were popular in Des Moines from 1912 to 1956.  It was also significant in the development of the western part of the city south of Grand Avenue, which is a major east–west thoroughfare. It has been listed on the National Register of Historic Places since 2003.

References

Historic districts in Des Moines, Iowa
National Register of Historic Places in Des Moines, Iowa
Houses on the National Register of Historic Places in Iowa
Houses in Des Moines, Iowa
Historic districts on the National Register of Historic Places in Iowa